Jeremy Richardson (born 3 March 1998) is a Grenadian footballer who plays as a goalkeeper for Paradise FC and the Grenada national football team.

Career

International
Richardson made his senior international debut on 8 March 2019, playing the entirety of a 1-1 friendly draw with St. Vincent & the Grenadines.

Career statistics

International

References

External links
Jeremy Richardson at Grenada FA

1998 births
Living people
Grenadian footballers
Grenada international footballers
Association football goalkeepers